Juan Azulay (born February 29, 1972) is a director, media artist, author and designer. As a director and media artist, he is known for his collaboration work with British band The Cult, Icelandic art rock band Sigur Rós, No Wave Legend Lydia Lunch and his directing work alongside Oscar-winner cinematographer Guillermo Navarro. His design work and films have received over a dozen recognized awards in competition and his work has been included in prestigious exhibitions like the 2011 Ville Fertile at Cite de l'Architecture et Patrimoine in Paris and is part of the permanent collection at the MAK in Vienna. Azulay's work is produced through a creative practice called MTTR MGMT, of which he is the creative director.

Film and Media Arts work
 "Flood Stains" with Lydia Lunch. Credited as writer and director. 2010 
 "The Blue of Noon" with Maurice Compte. Credited as writer and director. 2011 
 "Raven". Starring Deezer D. Credited as director. 2011 
 "Blue Eyed Sailor" with Guillermo Navarro and Mia Maestro ~ Music Video. 2012 
 "Let Me Be Your Light" with The Black Ryder ~ Music Video. 2015 
 "Rumors" with The Bulls ~ Music Video. 2015 
 "Dark Energy" with The Cult ~ Lyric Video. 2015 
 "Deeply Ordered Chaos" with The Cult ~ Lyric Video. 2015 
 "Hinterland" with The Cult ~ Music Video. 2016 
 "G O A T" with The Cult ~ Music Video. 2016 
 "Sound Bath" with Sigur Rós ~ Visual Media Live Show. 2017 
 "Norður og Niður: Liminal Sound Bath" with Sigur Rós and Alex Somers ~ Visual Media Live Show. 2017 
 "Form 2018 at Arcosanti" with Sigur Rós and Alex Somers ~ Visual Media Live Show. 2018
 "Give Me Mercy" with The Cult ~ Music Video. 2022

Design work
 "Aquatic Terrarium for the New Barcelona Zoo" in the Universal Forum of Cultures of 2004 in Barcelona, Spain. 2000 
 "Clifton Middle School" in Monrovia, California. 2003 
 "Northview Gymnasium" in Duarte, California. 2005 
 "3x1 Housing Project" in Hollywood, California. 2006 
 "Glendale Satellite Library" in Glendale, California. 2007 
 "MAK t6 Vacant" at the MAK Center Vienna. 2008 
 "Master Plan for Shaoxing, China" in Shaoxing, China. 2009 
 "Vivarium" at the Southern California Institute of Architecture. 2010 
 "7918 Tower" in Miami, Florida. 2017

References
 eVOLO 5 ARCHI73C7UR3 X3NOCUL7UR3 By Juan Azulay w/Benjamin Rice and Carlo Aiello . 300 pages Publisher: eVolo (February 28, 2013)
 Living Systems: Innovative Materials and Technologies for Landscape Architecture By Liat Margolis, Alexander Robinson 
 Movie Maker Magazine The Future of Movie Making 2008. March 2008, Vol. Spring 2008, Iss. 75, pg. 3, by: Bob Fisher
 Pulsation in Architecture [Paperback] by Eric Goldemberg. Publication Date: October 4, 2011  
 Manifiesto en Tierra de Nadie Oeste: Cambios de Estado. 2001. ISSN 0212-9043
 La Ville Fertile at Cité de l'Architecture et du Patrimoine. Palais de Chaillot, Paris, France. 2011. Exhibition of MAK t6 Vacant Project.
 Flowen Launch Los Angeles Times by Adam Tschorn. April 7.2015 at The George C. Page Museum at the La Brea Tar Pits in Los Angeles
 6 Innovative Fashion Brands Coming Out of L.A. by Alison C. Cohn. Elle Magazine, November 2015.
 The Cult Pays Tribute to Paris Tragedies With 'Deeply Ordered Chaos' by Luis Polanco. Billboard, November 2015.
 The Cult Premieres Hinterland by Chris Payne. Billboard, January 2016.
 Sound Bathing with Sigur Rós, Billboard Magazine, April 2017 

Notes

External links
 The Cult Give Me Mercy on NME 
 Mia Maestro Blue Eyed Sailor on NOWNESS
 Juan Azulay on imdb
 Juan Azulay Interview in the Harvard University Review of Latin America
 Vivarium in Designboom
 Flood Stains (Lunch & Azulay) in Abitare
 MAK t6 VACANT in Living Systems: Innovative Materials and Technologies for Landscape Architecture By Liat Margolis, Alexander Robinson 
 Barcelona 2004 Zoo Project (Azulay, Paez, Muro, Lay) in Arquitectura Viva
 3x1 Housing Project - Award of Merit American Institute of Architects P & F AIA 2005 PF
 MTTR MGMT on the WEB
 Juan Azulay at SCI-Arc
 Raven - dir. Juan Azulay - is awarded 2011 Best Experimental Film at the Los Angeles Underground Film Festival

1972 births
Living people
20th-century American architects
American music video directors
21st-century American architects